B Lab is a non-profit organization that was founded in 2006 in Berwyn, Pennsylvania. B Lab created, and awards, the B corporation certification for for-profit organizations. The "B" stands for beneficial and indicates that the certified organizations voluntarily meet certain standards of transparency, accountability, sustainability, and performance, with an aim to create value for society, not just for traditional stakeholders such as the shareholders.

In addition to awarding the B Corporation certifications, B Lab’s initiatives include administration of the B Impact Management programs and software, as well as advocacy for the adoption and improvement of benefit corporation statutes at the state level. (The B Corporation certification should not be confused with state-sanctioned benefit corporation status.) In that sense, B Lab is in the same historical tradition as private certification authorities such as Det Norske Veritas (a Norwegian foundation, operating as a classification society), UL (a private US company, whose standards are recognized by the insurance industry), and Germany's TÜV's (associations devoted to all aspects technical safety). These organizations formally are private-sector entities, but their reach is complementary with, and broadly comparable to, public or intergovernmental standards-setting bodies and certificating authorities.

B Lab runs a separate website devoted to information about benefit corporations and the progress of relevant state legislation.

B Lab has attracted media attention to the concept of benefit corporation. The concepts of benefit corporation and B Corporation are sometimes used interchangeably.

B Lab has established a partnership with the United Nations to help the private sector translate the Sustainable Development Goals (SDG) into practical business processes. B Lab created a SDG Action Manager that became available for companies to use in 2020.

References

External links 
 
 Certified B Corporations website
Benefit Corporation Information Center

 
Non-profit organizations based in Pennsylvania
Social responsibility organizations
2006 establishments in Pennsylvania